Salt is a dietary mineral, used for flavoring and preservation.

Salt or salts may also refer to:

Chemistry
 Salt (chemistry), an ionic compound
 Epsom salt, magnesium sulfate
 Glauber's salt, sodium sulfate
 Sodium chloride, the main ingredient in edible salt (table salt)
 Halite (rock salt)
 Road salt, calcium chloride or sodium chloride used to de-ice roads
 Sea salt, a mixture of salts and minerals, obtained by evaporation of seawater

Places
 Salt, Girona, Spain
 Salt, Jordan
 Salt Municipality, a municipality in and around Salt, Jordan
 Salt Rural LLG, Papua New Guinea
 Salt, Staffordshire, England
 Salt, Uttarakhand, a town in Uttarakhand, India
 Salt (Uttarakhand Assembly constituency), the state Assembly constituency centered around the town
 Salt River (disambiguation)

People with the name
 Salt (rapper) (born Cheryl James, 1966), a hip-hop artist and member of Salt-N-Pepa
 Abu al-Salt, Andalusian-Arab polymath
 Barbara Salt (1904–1975), a British diplomat
 Bernard Salt, an Australian financial writer
 Don Reitz, an American ceramic artist nicknamed "Mr. Salt"
 Edward Salt (1881–1970), a British politician
 George Salt (1903–2003), an English entomologist
 Henry Salt (Egyptologist) (1780–1827), an English artist, traveler, and diplomat
 Henry Stephens Salt (1851–1939), an English writer and campaigner for social reforms
 Jack Salt (born 1996), New Zealand basketball player
 Jennifer Salt (born 1944), an American actress and screenwriter
 John Salt (born 1937), an English artist
 John Stevenson Salt (1777–1845), an English banker
 John Salt (bishop), a South African Anglican bishop
 Phil Salt (cricketer) (born 1996), Welsh-born cricketer for Sussex
 Phil Salt (footballer) (born 1979), an English footballer
 Sam Salt (1940–2009), a British admiral
 Thomas Salt (1830–1904), British banker and politician
 Titus Salt (1803–1876), an English textile manufacturer and benefactor
 Waldo Salt (1914–1987), an American screenwriter
 William Salt (1808–1863), an English banker and genealogist
 Salt, a female professional wrestler from the Gorgeous Ladies of Wrestling

Arts, entertainment, and media

Fictional characters
 Salt, a character played by Haruka Shimazaki in the series Majisuka Gakuen
 Charlie Salt, a character played by Sammy Davis Jr. in the 1968 movie Salt and Pepper
 Evelyn Salt, the titular protagonist of the 2010 movie Salt
 Heluda Salt, a character in the 2002 Tamora Pierce novel Cold Fire
 Mr. Salt, a recurring character in the animated streaming television series Close Enough
 Sally Salt, a character played by Sarah Polley in the 1988 movie The Adventures of Baron Munchausen
 Veruca Salt (character), a character in the 1964 Roald Dahl novel Charlie and the Chocolate Factory

Films
 Salt (1965 film), a Bulgarian short documentary by Eduard Zahariev
 Salt (1985 film), North Korean tragedy film
 Salt (1987 film), an Indian Malayalam film
 Salt (2006 film), a thriller
 Salt (2009 film), a short documentary
 Salt (2010 film), an action film starring Angelina Jolie

Literature 
 Salt (Roberts novel), a 2000 science fiction novel by Adam Roberts
 Salt (Lovelace novel),  a 1997 Trinidadian novel by Earl Lovelace
 Salt: A World History, a non-fiction book by Mark Kurlansky

Music

Groups
 Salt (band), a Swedish alternative rock band
 SALT (band), a French-American rock band founded in 2016
 SALT (quartet), a Swedish barbershop quartet

Albums
 Salt (Angie McMahon album), 2019
 Salt (Forget Cassettes album)
 Salt (Lizz Wright album), 2003
 Salt (Venetian Snares album)
 Salt (Wuthering Heights album)

Songs
"Salt" (Ava Max song), 2018
"Salt" (Oh Land song), 2019
 "Salt", a song by Bad Suns from the album Language & Perspective
 "Salt", a song by Lizz Wright from the album Salt
 "Salt", a song by Madrugada from the album Industrial Silence
 "Salt", a song by Venetian Snares from the album Salt
 "S.A.L.T.", a song by The Orb on the album Orblivion
 "Salts", a song by Sannhet from the album So Numb

Opera
 "Salt", a mini-opera for alto voice, amplified cello and electronics by Missy Mazzoli from 2012

Computing
 Salt (cryptography), random data that is used as an additional input to a one-way function that hashes a password or passphrase
 Salt (software), a Python-based open source configuration management and remote execution application
 Speech Application Language Tags, an XML-based markup language
 Syntactic salt, a type of computer language syntax

Enterprises
 Salt Mobile SA, a Swiss mobile provider
 Salt Publishing, a book publisher
 Salts Healthcare Ltd, UK medical manufacturer
Salts Mill, former textile mill now art gallery etc in Saltaire, West Yorkshire, UK

Organizations
 SALT (institution), a non-profit institution in Istanbul, Turkey
 Sail and Life Training Society (SALTS), a non-profit Christian organization based in Victoria, British Columbia, which provides sail training and life lessons
 Salt Grammar School, former name of Titus Salt School, Bradford, England
 Salts F.C., a soccer team in Saltaire, West Yorkshire, England, UK
 Socialist Alternative (Australia) (SAlt; c.f. SA for Socialist Alliance), a revolutionary socialist organisation in Australia
 The Savior's Alliance for Lifting the Truth, a sexual abstinence organization

Other uses
 Salt (Swedish magazine), political magazine published between 1999 and 2002
 Salt (union organizing), a labor union member who gets a job at a specific workplace with the intent of organizing a union
 Salt cellar, also known just as "salt", tableware
 SALT Conference, a financial conference hosted by SkyBridge Capital
 Seminars About Long-term Thinking (SALT), a lecture series
 Skin-associated lymphoid tissue, a component of Mucosa-associated lymphoid tissue
 Southern African Large Telescope (SALT), a 10-metre class optical telescope at the South African Astronomical Observatory
 Speech and Language Therapy (SALT)
 State and local tax, especially in the context of the state and local tax ("SALT") deduction in United States federal income tax
 Strategic Arms Limitation Talks, nuclear weapon talks between the USA and USSR, or the resultant treaties:
 SALT I of 1972
 SALT II of 1979

See also
 Ionic compound
 Saltvik, a municipality of Åland
 Salter (disambiguation)
 Salting (disambiguation)
 Salty (disambiguation)
 Sault (disambiguation)